Gil Marco Shani (born 1968) is an Israeli painter, installation artist and educator, who lives and works in Tel Aviv.

Biography 
Gil Marco Shani was born in 1968 to Aaron and Leah Shani and raised in Tel Aviv, Israel. He graduated from the Bezalel Academy of Arts and Design, Jerusalem, Bachelor of Arts (1994), studied Art Studies at the Slade School, London (1994) and Shoe Design at Afpic Vocational Training School, Paris (1998).

Gil Marco Shani is a painter and installation artist. He has received numerous awards including the Gottesdiener Art Prize for Young Artists 2008 and the Sandberg Prize for Israeli Art 2018. His paintings are part of the permanent collections of the Tel Aviv Museum of Art, and the Israel Museum of Art.

In 1994 he exhibited in Transit as part of Art Focus and in 1997 he participated in Decorative Attendants, which merged human presence with exhibition objects as part of Threshold in the Young Artists Exhibitions series held at the Israel Museum, curated by Sarit Shapira. This series, dedicated to installation art, was a milestone in the development of installation art in Israel in the 1990s. In 1999, Shani's solo exhibition Friendship was held at the Dvir Gallery. In 2001 Shani built Safari, an installation, as part of Helena (with Avner Ben-Gal and Ohad Meromi), an exhibit at the Helena Rubinstein Contemporary Art Pavilion, the Tel Aviv Museum of Art. This exhibit was seminal in formulating contemporary trends in the Israeli installation art.

From the Sandberg Prize for Israeli Art committee: ['His paintings feature a schematic outline on a uniform background, and they mark events, many of which bubble under the surface of polite culture. Shani's superb installations are challenging architectural interventions implanted in the heart of the museum and examine the basic assumptions of the museum experience in all its aspects. The spaces he created, such as: motel rooms, tropical forest, nightly stairway or enclosed bus depot, are surprising environments, charged and rich in details. Shani succeeds in surprising visitors each time in an artificial environment, full of beauty that is enveloped by a petrifying silence and feelings of threat and anxiety. The ambitious installation "Busses," which is currently on display at the Israel Museum, is one of the highlights of his work and a major achievement in Shani's consistent body of work.'

Shani is a faculty member and senior lecturer at the Art Department, Bezalel Academy of Arts and Design.

In 2018, his son Lev was born in Tel Aviv, co-parented with Renan Mosinson.

Exhibitions

Selected solo exhibitions
2018: 'Buses', The Israel Museum, Jerusalem; Curated by Aya Miron (catalogue)

Prizes and grants
1994: Mary Fisher Prize, Bezalel Academy of Arts and Design
1999: The Young Artist Award, Israel’s Ministry of Science, Culture and Sports
2001: Dizengoff Prize for Painting and Sculpture, Tel Aviv–Yafo municipality
2003: Beatrice Kolliner Prize for a Young Israeli Artist, The Israel Museum, Jerusalem
2004: America–Israel Cultural Foundation scholarship
2005: The Shmuel Givon Prize, Tel Aviv Museum of Art, Tel Aviv
2008: Nathan Gottesdiener Foundation Israeli Art Prize, Tel Aviv Museum of Art
2017: Outset Israel grant
— National Lottery Council for the Arts grant for publishing an artist’s book
2018: Sandberg Prize for Israeli Art 2018

Artist books and catalogs 
2000: "Friendship", Dvir Gallery
2001: Safari / Safari, Tel Aviv Museum
2001: Bird Watching School / Birding School, Tel Aviv Museum
2007 Dome Gil Marco Shani, Revolver Press
2018: Buses, Israel Museum | English Buses Catalog, Buses Hebrew Catalog

Gallery

References

Primary

Secondary

External links 

 Gil Marco Shani Drawings 2012-2018
There Is Life in the Artificial Sarah Breitberg-Semel in Conversation with Gil Marco Shani

Gay painters
Academic staff of Bezalel Academy of Arts and Design
1968 births
Living people
Bezalel Academy of Arts and Design alumni
Israeli gay artists
Israeli LGBT painters
21st-century Israeli painters
Alumni of the Slade School of Fine Art
People from Tel Aviv